Boreotrophon houarti is a species of sea snail in the family Muricidae.

Description

Distribution

References

Muricidae
Gastropods described in 1994